Blackfen is an area of south-east London, England, north of Sidcup in the London Borough of Bexley. Prior to 1965 it was in the county of Kent.

"Blackfen" means a black, marshy area. The soil is dark and fertile and the area around Blackfen Road and Wellington Avenue is prone to flooding in extreme conditions. The housing stock is almost exclusively owner-occupied houses of conventional British design. The sale of the Danson Estate in 1922 marked the beginning of a major period of house building in the area and most of the houses date from the 1930s.

Local services

Churches
The  Catholic Church of Our Lady of the Rosary near the top end of Burnt Oak Lane was built in 1936. Originally part of the parish of St Stephen's, Welling, it became a parish Church in its own right in 1945.

The Anglican  Church of the Holy Redeemer in Days Lane, dedicated on 21 October 1933, is built entirely of steel and concrete. The architect was A.S.R. Ley. The Church describes itself as a "forward-looking, average Anglican congregation". The Good Shepherd Church on Blackfen Road is part of the parish of Holy Redeemer.

Pubs
At the junction of Blackfen Road and Westwood Lane, is the George Staples (formerly known as The Woodman). The original Woodman pub dates from 1845; the present building was completed in 1931. The pub has undergone several changes of character, including being promoted as a "Sports Bar". The new landlords have transformed the pub into the George Staples in order to counter the increasingly bad reputation The Woodman had developed. It is now being promoted as a family friendly pub.

Half a mile west along the Blackfen Road, on the south side is the "Jolly Fenman", built in the 1950s. The Fenman was refurbished in February 2006 and again in 2017 and it offers table service for meals. For about 4 years in the mid-1980s this pub had its own in-house brewery.

Just north towards Welling, in Westwood Lane, Bexley Borough's 3rd Micropub opened in spring 2015 called The Broken Drum (named after an inn in one of Terry Pratchett's novels). It has subsequently been awarded the prestigious SPBW London Pub of the Year 2018 award.

Library
The  Blackfen Library moved from Cedar Avenue to newly refurbished premises on Blackfen Road in March 2005. There was some local controversy because of the character of the old library building and uncertainty as to whether the premises would be put to any use. In April 2016 Bexley Council handed over control of Blackfen Library to the New Generation Church Trust, and Blackfen Library became Blackfen Community Library.

Shopping
There are two principal shopping parades, on Blackfen Road and at The Oval.

At the Oval, there are three restaurants and a number of other small shops and businesses.  The crescent-shaped parade of shops includes flats above and fronts an oval-shaped unfenced public garden with paths, flower beds and ornamental trees. Both the parade, with Tudoresque details to the frontage, and this small municipal garden are included in a designated Conservation Area.     Underneath the public garden is a large World War II air-raid shelter.

The larger shopping centre of Blackfen lacks greenery or architectural finesse, but includes a large foodstore (Co-op) with free parking space next to a prominent flyover that carries the modern A2 Trunk Road. The Blackfen Road shops include a post office, several car sales showrooms and many small local businesses including cafés and fast food outlets, jewellers, clothing shops, hairdressers, building suppliers, cycle store and an independent funeral director. It benefits from direct bus links to larger shopping centres at Bexleyheath, Eltham, Sidcup, Welling and Woolwich.

Greenery
The River Shuttle flows eastward through Blackfen; along the river in this area are four parks/open spaces. In the order they appear on the course of the river, they are: Parish Wood, Holly Oak Wood Park, Willersley Park, and Marlborough Park. Wyncham Stream flowing north joins the River Shuttle at Holly Oak Wood Park; there is a small wood on this stream called Beverley Wood.

Education

Blackfen School for Girls is at the eastern end of Blackfen Road. Our Lady of the Rosary Catholic Primary School is in Holbeach Gardens. Days Lane Primary School is the largest primary school in the borough of Bexley and has approximately 650 children on its role. Sherwood Park Primary School is located off Sherwood Park Avenue and Ramillies Road.

The University of Greenwich Avery Hill Campus is located less than 1 mile to the West of the area.

Transport
Blackfen is served by London Buses routes 51 to Woolwich via Welling and Orpington via Sidcup, 132 to North Greenwich via Eltham and to Bexleyheath, and B13 to New Eltham and Bexleyheath.

Nearby areas
Blackfen borders Welling to the north west, north and north east, Blendon to the east and south east, Sidcup to the south and Avery Hill to the south west and west.

References

External links
Ideal Homes, suburbia in focus: Blackfen
Blackfen Website
Blackfen Public Library

Areas of London
Districts of the London Borough of Bexley
Sidcup